Edward Louis Kotal (September 1, 1902 – January 27, 1973) was an American football player, coach, and scout. He played college football at Lawrence University in Appleton, Wisconsin and professionally with the Green Bay Packers of the National Football League (NFL). Kotal served as the head football coach at Lawrence in 1930 and at Central State Teachers College—now known as the University of Wisconsin–Stevens Point—from 1931 to 1941, compiling a career college football coaching record of 40–41–9. He also coached basketball, track and field, and boxing at Stevens Point before returning to the NFL in 1942 as an assistant coach for the Packers and later as a scout and assistant coach for the Los Angeles Rams.

Early life and playing career
Kotal was on September 1, 1902 in Chicago, Illinois. He played college football at Lawrence University.

Kotal played in the National Football League (NFL) with the Green Bay Packers for five seasons. He was a member of the 1929 NFL Champion Packers.

Coaching career
Kotal coached football, basketball, track and field, and boxing at the University of Wisconsin–Stevens Point. He led teams to conference championships in all four sports and is an inductee in the University's Athletic Hall of Fame.

In 1942, Kotal returned to the Green Bay Packers organization as a backfield coach and scout before becoming the chief scout for the Los Angeles Rams in 1946. In subsequent years, Kotal also assumed coaching responsibilities for the Rams as well.

Head coaching record

Football

See also
 List of Green Bay Packers players

References

External links
 
 

1902 births
1973 deaths
American football halfbacks
American football quarterbacks
Basketball coaches from Illinois
Green Bay Packers coaches
Green Bay Packers players
Green Bay Packers scouts
Lawrence Vikings football coaches
Lawrence Vikings football players
Los Angeles Rams coaches
Los Angeles Rams scouts
Wisconsin–Stevens Point Pointers football coaches
Wisconsin–Stevens Point Pointers men's basketball coaches
College boxing coaches in the United States
College track and field coaches in the United States
Sportspeople from Chicago
Players of American football from Chicago
American people of Czech descent